Michael Hawkins (born July 15, 1983 in Dallas, Texas) is a former American football cornerback. He was signed by the Dallas Desperados in 2004 and drafted by the Green Bay Packers in the fifth round of the 2005 NFL Draft. He played college football at Oklahoma. After a few Arena Football League seasons, he was selected by the Green Bay Packers with the 167th overall selection in the 2005 NFL Draft. He was picked up by the Minnesota Vikings off of waivers in 2006.

Hawkins has been a member of the Cleveland Browns, Minnesota Vikings, Dallas Cowboys, Tampa Bay Buccaneers and Oakland Raiders.

Oklahoma Sooners 2002
In his only season at Oklahoma, Hawkins played in five games during the 2002 season. He recorded five tackles (4 solos) with a pass deflection and returned an interception 45 yards for a touchdown vs. UTEP. He seemed destined for stardom, but left the team after the season to play for the Arena Football League's Dallas Desperados.

External links
Just Sports Stats
Green Bay Packers bio
Oakland Raiders bio

1983 births
Living people
Players of American football from Dallas
American football cornerbacks
Oklahoma Sooners football players
Dallas Desperados players
Green Bay Packers players
Cleveland Browns players
Minnesota Vikings players
Dallas Cowboys players
Tampa Bay Buccaneers players
Oakland Raiders players